IOGT-NTO is a Swedish temperance society, the Swedish branch of IOGT International. In 2007, it had approximately 46,000 members, in 1,000 local groups.

History

IOGT was established in Sweden in 1879, when the first local chapter was started in Klippan, and was then called Godtemplarorden. In 1888, a group of people left Godtemplarorden to form another temperance order, Nationalgodtemplarorden.

Activities
IOGT-NTO works to promote total abstinence from alcohol among its members and in society. The organisation also offers a variety of study circles in various subjects, which are open to non-members.

It operates two folk high schools, and a treatment facility for alcohol abusers.

Youth organisations
The youth organisation affiliated with IOGT-NTO is Ungdomens Nykterhetsförbund, which as of 2007 had 125 local clubs. IOGT-NTO also runs an organisation for children, called Junis.

Nykterhetsrörelsens Scoutförbund (The Temperance Movement's Scouting Association) is a scouting organisation which is also part of IOGT-NTO.

See also 

 Svenska Sällskapet för Nykterhet och Folkuppfostran – another Swedish temperance society

References

External links
Official website

Alcohol in Sweden
Temperance organizations